David Larmour may refer to:
Davy Larmour (boxer) (born 1952), Northern Irish boxer
Davy Larmour (footballer) (born 1977), Northern Irish footballer
David H. J. Larmour, Paul Whitfield Horn Professor and Head of Classics at Texas Tech University